National Route 290 is a national highway of Japan connecting Murakami, Niigata and Uonuma, Niigata in Japan, with a total length of 165.5 km (102.84 mi).

References

National highways in Japan
Roads in Niigata Prefecture